Drepanolepis is an extinct genus of thelodont which lived in Canada during the Early Devonian period.

Morphology 
Drepanolepis possessed a tall, angelfish-like body, with a ventral mouth and a hypocercal tail. The gill atrium is large for this order, and the nasal runs down to the oral cavity from the orbit. The oral cavity is jawless, with no premaxilla or maxilla present.

References

Early Devonian fish
Devonian jawless fish
Thelodonti genera
Fossils of Canada